Milliman is a surname. Notable people with the surname include:

Jake Milliman, American professional wrestler
James C. Milliman (1847–1933), American politician
Wendell Milliman (1905–1976), American businessman

See also
Millman

English-language surnames